Vojtěch Král (born 4 July 1988) is a Czech orienteering competitor, and junior world champion.

He became Junior World Champion in sprint in Dubbo in 2007.

He competed at the 2012 World Orienteering Championships. In the sprint competition he qualified for the final, where he placed 10th.

See also
 List of orienteers
 List of orienteering events

References

External links

1988 births
Living people
Czech orienteers
Male orienteers
Foot orienteers
World Games bronze medalists
Competitors at the 2017 World Games
World Games medalists in orienteering
People from Šumperk
Sportspeople from the Olomouc Region
20th-century Czech people
21st-century Czech people
Junior World Orienteering Championships medalists
Competitors at the 2022 World Games